Lists of English cricketers include:

National men
 List of England Test cricketers
 List of England ODI cricketers
 List of England Twenty20 International cricketers

National women
 List of England women Test cricketers
 List of England women ODI cricketers
 List of England women Twenty20 International cricketers

Current first-class counties
 List of Derbyshire County Cricket Club players
 List of Durham County Cricket Club players
 List of Essex County Cricket Club players
 List of Glamorgan County Cricket Club players
 List of Gloucestershire County Cricket Club players
 List of Hampshire County Cricket Club players
 List of Kent County Cricket Club players
 List of Lancashire County Cricket Club players
 List of Leicestershire County Cricket Club players
 List of Middlesex County Cricket Club players
 List of Northamptonshire County Cricket Club players
 List of Nottinghamshire County Cricket Club players
 List of Somerset County Cricket Club players
 List of Surrey County Cricket Club players
 List of Sussex County Cricket Club players
 List of Warwickshire County Cricket Club players
 List of Worcestershire County Cricket Club players
 List of Yorkshire County Cricket Club players

Current women's regional teams
 List of Central Sparks cricketers
 List of Northern Diamonds cricketers
 List of North West Thunder cricketers
 List of South East Stars cricketers
 List of Southern Vipers cricketers
 List of Sunrisers women's cricketers
 List of The Blaze women's cricketers
 List of Western Storm cricketers

The Hundred teams
 List of Birmingham Phoenix cricketers
 List of London Spirit cricketers
 List of Manchester Originals cricketers
 List of Northern Superchargers cricketers
 List of Oval Invincibles cricketers
 List of Southern Brave cricketers
 List of Trent Rockets cricketers
 List of Welsh Fire cricketers

Marylebone Cricket Club
 Lists of Marylebone Cricket Club players
 List of Marylebone Cricket Club players (1787–1826)
 List of Marylebone Cricket Club players (1827–1863)
 List of Marylebone Cricket Club players (1864–1894)
 List of Marylebone Cricket Club players (1895–1914)
 List of Marylebone Cricket Club players (1919–1939)
 List of Marylebone Cricket Club players (1946–1977)
 List of Marylebone Cricket Club players (1978–)

Gentlemen v Players
 List of Gentlemen cricketers (1806–1840)
 List of Gentlemen cricketers (1841–1962)
 List of Players cricketers (1806–1840)
 List of Players cricketers (1841–1962)

Former first-class universities
 List of British Universities cricketers
 List of Cambridge UCCE & MCCU players
 List of Cambridge University Cricket Club players
 List of Cardiff MCCU players
 List of Combined Universities cricket team players
 List of Durham UCCE & MCCU players
 List of Leeds/Bradford MCCU players
 List of Loughborough MCCU players
 List of Oxford UCCE & MCCU players
 List of Oxford University Cricket Club players
 List of Oxford and Cambridge Universities cricket team players

Former first-class teams
 List of Cambridge Town Club and Cambridgeshire cricketers
 List of Combined Services (United Kingdom) cricketers
 List of Gentlemen of Kent cricketers
 List of I Zingari first-class cricketers
 List of Kent county cricketers to 1842
 List of London County Cricket Club players
 List of Manchester Cricket Club players
 List of Norfolk first-class cricketers
 List of Nottingham Cricket Club players
 List of Royal Air Force first-class cricketers
 List of Sheffield Cricket Club players
 List of Suffolk first-class cricketers

Minor counties
 List of Bedfordshire County Cricket Club List A players
 List of Berkshire County Cricket Club List A players
 List of Buckinghamshire County Cricket Club List A players
 List of Cambridgeshire County Cricket Club List A players
 List of Cheshire County Cricket Club List A players
 List of Cornwall County Cricket Club List A players
 List of Cumberland County Cricket Club List A players
 List of Devon County Cricket Club List A players
 List of Dorset County Cricket Club List A players
 List of Herefordshire County Cricket Club List A players
 List of Hertfordshire County Cricket Club List A players
 List of Huntingdonshire County Cricket Club List A players
 List of Lincolnshire County Cricket Club List A players
 List of Minor Counties cricketers
 List of Minor Counties East List A players
 List of Minor Counties North List A players
 List of Minor Counties South List A players
 List of Minor Counties West List A players
 List of Norfolk County Cricket Club List A players
 List of Northumberland County Cricket Club List A players
 List of Oxfordshire County Cricket Club List A players
 List of Shropshire County Cricket Club List A players
 List of Staffordshire County Cricket Club List A players
 List of Suffolk County Cricket Club List A players
 List of Unicorns List A players
 List of Wales Minor Counties Cricket Club List A players
 List of Wiltshire County Cricket Club List A players

County cricket boards
 List of Derbyshire Cricket Board List A players
 List of Durham Cricket Board List A players
 List of Essex Cricket Board List A players
 List of Gloucestershire Cricket Board List A players
 List of Hampshire Cricket Board List A players
 List of Kent Cricket Board List A players
 List of Lancashire Cricket Board List A players
 List of Leicestershire Cricket Board List A players
 List of Middlesex Cricket Board List A players
 List of Northamptonshire Cricket Board List A players
 List of Nottinghamshire Cricket Board List A players
 List of Somerset Cricket Board List A players
 List of Surrey Cricket Board List A players
 List of Sussex Cricket Board List A players
 List of Warwickshire Cricket Board List A players
 List of Worcestershire Cricket Board List A players
 List of Yorkshire Cricket Board List A players

Former women's regional teams
 List of Lancashire Thunder cricketers
 List of Loughborough Lightning cricketers
 List of Surrey Stars cricketers
 List of Yorkshire Diamonds cricketers

Players by era
 List of English cricketers to 1771
 List of English cricketers (1772–1786)
 List of English cricketers (1787–1825)
 List of English cricketers (1826–1840)
 List of English cricketers (1841–1850)
 List of English cricketers (1851–1860)
 List of English cricketers (1861–1870)

Birthplace
List of English international cricketers born outside of England

See also
:Category:Lists of English cricketers
Lists of Scottish cricketers

Lists of sports lists
Lists of English cricketers